CEA cell adhesion molecule 18 is a protein that in humans is encoded by the CEACAM18 gene.

CEACAM18 is a carcinoembryonic antigen.

References